Homoroade is a commune of 2,600 inhabitants situated in Satu Mare County, Romania. Its center is Homorodu de Mijloc, and the commune is composed of six villages:

References

Communes in Satu Mare County

hu:Középhomoród